Hasanabad-e Sofla (also Romanized as Ḩasanābād-e Soflá; also known as Ḩasanābād-e Pā’īn) is a village in Padena-ye Olya Rural District, Padena District, Semirom County, Isfahan Province, Iran. At the 2006 census, its population was 341, in 78 families.

References 

Populated places in Semirom County